Radau is a river of Lower Saxony, Germany. It is right tributary of the Oker. It rises in the Harz range, leaves the mountains at Bad Harzburg, and discharges into the Oker near Vienenburg.

Course

The raised bog stretches from Torfhaus, a hamlet belonging to the Clausthal-Zellerfeld municipality, to the Brocken massif in the east. The historic peat cutting area today is part of the Harz National Park and can be reached via the scenic trail Goethe Way.

The artificial waterfall was constructed as a tourist attraction in 1859 on behalf of the Duchy of Brunswick State Railway company, which had operated the Brunswick–Bad Harzburg railway line since 1841. Beneath the waterfall is a restaurant and a miniature railway integrated into the landscape.

Passing west of the Großer Burgberg mountain, the river flows through the Bad Harzburg and Vienenburg urban areas. The Radau discharges into the Oker river northeast of Vienenburg, near the village of Wiedelah at the eastern rim of the Harly Forest.

Water management

Since 1981, shares of the Radau waters are discharged to the Oker Dam and the Romkerhall hydroelectric plant run by the Harzwasserwerke company, as well as for drinking water treatment at the Grane Dam. While the upper current is almost left in its natural state, the lower sections are more obstructed; recently, fish ladders have been built to facilitate natural migration.

History
In the Middle Ages the Radowe was used for the rafting of logs and wooden palettes stacked with peat. To that end the river was dammed by 6 raft locks. The goods to be rafted, that had previously been dropped in the river, were transported downstream with the additional weight of water.

Remarks on pronunciation 
 Radau (river): stress on the first syllable
 Radau (German for noise, din, cf. "row"): stress on the last syllable

See also 
 List of rivers of Lower Saxony

References 

Rivers of Lower Saxony
Rivers of the Harz
Waterfalls of Germany
Rivers of Germany